Óscar Mario "Bocha" González Alonso (10 November 1923 – 5 November 2006) was a racing driver from Uruguay.

González participated in one Formula One Grand Prix, the 1956 Argentine Grand Prix on 22 January 1956, finishing sixth in a shared drive with countryman Alberto Uria. He scored no championship points.

Complete Formula One results
(key)

''* Indicates shared drive with Alberto Uria

References

1923 births
2006 deaths
Uruguayan racing drivers
Uruguayan Formula One drivers